

"Our Hitch in Hell" is a ballad by American poet Frank Bernard Camp, originally published as one of 49 ballads in a 1917 collection entitled American Soldier Ballads, that went on to inspire multiple variants among American law enforcement and military, either as The Final Inspection, 
the Soldier's Prayer (or Poem), the Policeman's Prayer (or Poem), and variations on those titles.

The final lines of the poem speak of the protagonist being automatically accepted into Heaven due to having already served time in Hell, Hell being their military service:

In his 1949 work The Struggle for Guadalcanal, military historian Samuel Eliot Morison transcribed a Marine variant of the poem (possibly authored by James A. Donohue) from the epitaph on the Lunga Point Cemetery grave of Private First Class William Cameron, who had died in that battle:

In popular culture 

The text of the Anderson epitaph, with "one more soldier" replacing "another marine", appears prior to starting the opening level of the Medal of Honor: Frontline video game.

The ballad has been frequently reproduced without authorship, or under someone else's name, and has inspired adaptations of the poem (such as the "Policeman's Prayer" and "The Final Inspection") by and for members of armed forces and law-enforcement agencies—even by high-risk professions such as miners.

Notes

References

External links
 

1917 poems
1917 songs
20th-century ballads
Works about the military of the United States
Law enforcement in the United States
World War I poems
American poems